The London Schools Symphony Orchestra (LSSO) is a youth orchestra with musicians drawn from students in London schools, and featuring professional conductors and soloists. It was founded in 1951.  Its founder and original director was the late Dr Leslie Russell, at one time assisted by Niso Ticciati. From 1990 until 2001 the artistic director was Oliver Butterworth. The current artistic director is American conductor/composer Peter Ash.

The orchestra gives three concerts annually in the Barbican, in January, April and September which are preceded by intense eight-day rehearsal periods during the school holidays. The LSSO is often joined by various professional musicians, as well as conductors, who perform concertos with the orchestra. Some of these include Matthew Trusler, who played the Korngold Violin Concerto in January 2012 and Louise Hopkins who played the Dvořák Cello Concerto in B Minor with the orchestra whilst on tour in the Czech Republic in July 2012. Guest conductors have included, Sir Simon Rattle, Leif Segerstam, Sir Colin Davis and Nicholas Kraemer. The summer course in July is usually followed by a tour abroad and the orchestra has visited countries as far afield as Japan, the US and Argentina as well as many places in Europe. The summer course also includes a "Serenade Concert" both on tour and back in London which consists of performances of smaller ensembles made up of and conducted by members of the orchestras. Students wishing to conduct are tutored by Artistic Director Peter Ash in the months beforehand. A number of members who first experienced conducting in this way have gone on to form orchestras of their own made up of school and university students. These include Oliver Zeffman's Melos Sinfonia, Harry Ogg's Sinfonia d'Amici and Rory Storm's Aeolian Orchestra.

See also 
 List of youth orchestras

External links
 London Schools Symphony Orchestra, official home page
 London Schools Symphony Orchestra, classicsonline.com

British symphony orchestras
English youth orchestras
Musical groups from London